Somnath railway station is a railway station in the city of Veraval, Gujarat. It is under Bhavnagar railway division of Western Railway zone of Indian Railways.

Trains

The following trains start from Somnath railway station:

References

Railway stations in Gir Somnath district
Bhavnagar railway division
Railway stations in India opened in 1888
Transport in Veraval